Eshkowri (also Romanized as Eshkowrī, Eshkoori, and Oshkūrī) is a village in Sefidar Rural District, Khafr District, Jahrom County, Fars Province, Iran. At the 2006 census, its population was 381, in 84 families.

References 

Populated places in  Jahrom County